Six-hour clock may refer to:

 Thai six-hour clock
 Italian six-hour clock